Captain Conan (original title: Capitaine Conan) is a 1996 French drama film directed by Bertrand Tavernier. It is based on the 1934 Prix Goncourt-winning novel Captain Conan (Fr. Capitaine Conan) by Roger Vercel.

Plot
In the French infantry on the Macedonian front during the First World War, Conan, an officer of the elite Chasseurs Alpins, is the charismatic leader of a special squad, many from military prisons, who raid enemy lines at night taking no prisoners. Despising career soldiers, his only friend is the young academic Norbert.

When the Armistice with Bulgaria is signed in September 1918, his unit is sent to Bucharest, capital of France's ally Romania, as part of the Allied intervention in the Russian Civil War. Neither fighting nor demobilised, morale plummets and courts-martial begin. After a successful defence,  Norbert is coerced into becoming the prosecutor by the threat that, if he does not, Conan will be charged. In a brutal raid on a crowded nightclub, some of Conan's men seized the takings, crippling a female singer and killing the female cashier. With the help of the Romanian police and a French prostitute, Norbert finds the men but gets them light sentences.

A widow arrives from France looking for her son, whom she finds awaiting trial for desertion. After listening to her story, Norbert thinks that the boy may be blameless and that his officer is out to get him shot. Conan, who hates the officer, agrees and takes Norbert over the old front line where the boy got lost in action. Both become convinced of his innocence.

Fighting breaks out again when the French move up to the Danube and come under attack from the Red Army. During the action, Conan empties the prison and leads his men to one final victory. In a sombre coda, years later back in France, Norbert visits Conan to find him no longer the dashing hero but the sick owner of a little shop.

Cast

 Philippe Torreton: Conan
 Samuel Le Bihan: Norbert
 Bernard Le Coq: Lieutenant de Scève
 Catherine Rich : Madeleine Erlane
 François Berléand: Commandant Bouvier
 Claude Rich: General Pitard de Lauzier
 Cécile Vassort: Georgette
 André Falcon: Colonel Voirin
 Claude Brosset: Father Dubreuil
 Crina Muresan: Ilyana
 Cécile Vassort: Georgette
 François Levantal: Forgeol
 Pierre Val: Jean Erlane
 Roger Knobelspiess: Major Cuypene
 Frédéric Pierrot: Conductor
 Jean-Claude Calon: officier Loisy
 Laurent Schilling: Beuillard
 Jean-Yves Roan: Rouzic
 Philippe Héliès: Grenais
 Tonio Descanvelle: Caboulet
 Eric Savin: Gunsmith
 Olivier Loustau: Mahut
 Jean-Marie Juan: Lethore
 Laurent Bateau: Perrin, soldier
 Eric Dufay: Lieutenant Fideli
 Philippe Frécon: Ménard, the cook
 Patrick Delage: Messinge, the waiter
 Patrick Brossard: Riquiou
 Yvon Crenn: Floch
 Christophe Odent: Cabanel
 Franck Jazédé: Havrecourt
 Dominique Compagnon: Morel
 Frédéric Diefenthal: sergeant gare Bucarest
 Luminiţa Anghel: singer in a bar
 Radu Duda: Insp. Stefanesco

Reception
The film has two out of three fresh reviews on Rotten Tomatoes, even though there are more reviews listed.

Janet Maslin, of The New York Times, said that Mr. Torreton powerfully embodies the film's central questions of what a fighter becomes without combat and where the values inherent in savage battle may lead. Ken Fox, of TV Guide, said beautiful as it is brutal and that it is one of the best war films of recent years. Alex Albanese, of Box Office, said that the film is finely wrought—as hard, precise and heartbreaking as its title character.

Awards and nominations
Bertrand Tavernier won the César Award for Best Director and Phillippe Torreton won the César Award for Best Actor. The film was also nominated for six other César Awards including Best Film, Best Writing and Most Promising Actor. The film was nominated for Film Presented at the Telluride Film Festival.

DVD release
The DVD is in French with English subtitles, widescreen, and has a 2.0-channel PCM audio mix. The only special feature on the DVD is Un Film Sur Bertrand Tavernier, a fifty-four-minute documentary about the making of the film. The release date of the DVD was December 19, 2000.

References

External links
 
 
 

1996 films
Films directed by Bertrand Tavernier
French war films
1990s French-language films
Romanian-language films
World War I films set on the Eastern Front
Russian Civil War films
Films set in 1918
Films whose director won the Best Director César Award
1990s war films
1990s English-language films
1990s French films